Ajax Kenitra is a futsal club based in Kenitra, Morocco.

Honours
Bonn International Tournament 
1990, 1992, 1993, 1994, 1995, 1996, 1998
Montreal International Tournament
1994
Brazil International Tournament
1995
Prague International Tournament
1997
Valence International Tournament
1997
Roma International Tournament
1998
Brussels International Tournament
1998
Madrid International Tournament
1997
Romans International Tournament

1997 L'Ajax représente l'Afrique au 1e tournoi euro-africaine à Lisabone (Portugal).

1997 L'Ajax participe en coupe du monde en Mexico.

1998 L'Ajax remporte le tournoi de Rome en Italie.

1998 L'Ajax remporte le tournoi de Bonn.

1998 L'Ajax remporte le tournoi de Bruxelles en Belgique.

1998 L'Ajax finaliste au championnat d'Europe des clubs champions en Seberi dans l'état de Yakoutia (Russie).

1998 L'Ajax représente le Maroc au congrès de FIFUSA à Caracas (Venezuela).

1998 L'Ajax répond favorable à la demande de la FRMF pour représenter le Maroc au 1e championnat arabe au Caire (Egypte). L'Ajax termine en 2e place.

1999 L'Ajax remporte le tournoi international d'Abu Dhabi aux EAU.

1999 L'Ajax a été reçu par le pape Jean Paul II au Vatican.

1999 La FIFA confie à l'Ajax de Kenitra l'organisation du 1e tournoi méditerranéen des clubs au Maroc.

2000 L'Ajax participe en coupe du monde en Bolivie.

Famous players
Yahya Baya
Hamid Berrada
Hassan Chikhi
Hicham Dguig
Brahim Louriki
Boubker Ouakrouch
Zakaria Kauiri (Ziko)
Sidi Ahmed Soaf
Jalal Rhamirich
Fatah Rhamirich
Bouzad
Adil Habil
Hajib Azaar

External links
Official website

Sport in Morocco